The Juhaynah (also transliterated as Djuhaynah and Johaynah) are a nomad tribe of the Arabian Peninsula and the largest clan of Banu Quda'a. They are one of the most powerful Arabian tribes that rule important parts of the Arabian Peninsula.  The clan remains prevalent in the Arabian Peninsula, Saudi Arabia mostly in the region of Madinah and the cities of Yanbu, Umluj, Alshabaha, Tabuk, and Jeddah. They are also present in Jordan, among other regions, and Egypt. Additionally, in Sudan they are present in scarce numbers in the eastern region due to the migrations of several Arab tribes into Sudan during the 11th century. As well as in the West of Sudan and Chad as Baggara & Abbala Arabs, who hail from Abdallah Al Juhani.

Culture and spirituality of Juhaynah

Juhaina was the first Arab tribe to entirely convert to Islam. They are known to be fond of education and writing and had many poets. They were well educated before being committed to Islamic teachings. They were also known to be powerful, and many Juhanis participated in battles at the time.

One of its members, 'Abd ad-Dar b. Hudayb, to build a Qawdam (an artifact that could compete with the Kaaba in Mecca), since the time of Jahiliyya able to attract many pilgrims and create a trade fair where he concluded lucrative business.

Relations with Yathrib

Relations with Yathrib were overall good, so much so that, at the Battle of Bu'ath of 617, the Juhaynah fought with the Arab tribe of Banu Khazraj, while Badr were on the side of Banu Aws.
They reached an agreement with Muhammad, once these installed himself with his Muslim followers to Medina, which allowed them not to embrace the Islamic religion which, however, later converted, becoming perhaps the first tribal group fighting alongside Muslims the affirmation of their cause.

In the conquest of Mecca (629 CE) it was present with 800 warriors and 50 knights, although figures Al-Tabari provides are more generous still, with approximately 1,400 men.

The tribe (part of which had emigrated to Egypt) remained faithful to Islam during the Ridda wars and participated later, at the time of the second Caliph Umar, to the conquest of Egypt, some of them remained to reside in Egypt when the Caliph Umar appointed one of the prophet companion and Juhaynah leaders Uqbah ibn Amir Aljuhani as the governor of Egypt.

Notable people
Among the tribe's members are: 

 Uqba ibn Amir, companion of Muhammad
 Ma'bad al-Juhani, Qadari And the first person to talk about fate in Islam
 Abdullah Awad Al Juhany, one of the Imams of the Great Mosque of Mecca 
 Deena Aljuhani, Saudi princess and businesswoman 
 Feras Bugnah, Saudi filmmaker, video blogger and actor

See also
Tribes of Arabia
Quda'a

References

Tribes of Arabia
Quda'a